Adam Skrodzki (born December 23, 1983) is a Polish fencer. At the 2012 Summer Olympics, he competed in the Men's sabre, but was defeated in the second round.

References

External links
 

1983 births
Living people
Polish male fencers
Olympic fencers of Poland
Fencers at the 2012 Summer Olympics
People from Siemianowice Śląskie
Sportspeople from Silesian Voivodeship
European Games competitors for Poland
Fencers at the 2015 European Games